Michael Cavadias (born February 16, 1970) is an American actor known for Wonder Boys, the 2012 TV series Girls, and Difficult People, as well as performing in theatre with the Mabou Mines and Blacklips

Early life and education
Cavadias was born in Santa Cruz, California in 1970. Cavadias graduated from the Experimental Theatre Wing at the Tisch School of the Arts and later performed with Mabou Mines.

Career
Cavadias began his acting career in 1994 when he appeared in New York Undercover as Ruby. Cavadias developed the character Claywoman at Blacklips and then with Mabou Mines as a part of their resident artist program. He was also a drag performer. Cavadias is most known for his acting work in film, appearing in Wonder Boys, Gypsy 83, and Kill Your Darlings.

Filmography

Film

Television

References

1970 births
Living people
American male film actors
Male actors from California
People from Santa Cruz, California
Tisch School of the Arts alumni